The 2009 Giro d'Italia Femminile, or Giro Donne, was the 20th running of the Giro d'Italia Femminile, one of the premier events of the women's road cycling calendar. It was held over nine stages from 3–12 July 2009, starting in Scarperia and finishing in Grumo Nevano.

Teams
Eighteen teams were invited to the Giro d'Italia Femminile.
These teams were:

Australia National Team
Bigla Cycling Team
Bizkaia–Durango–Champion System

Equipe Nürnberger Versicherung
Fenixs–Edilsavino
Gauss RDZ Ormu–Colnago

S.C. Michela Fanini Record Rox
Safi–Pasta Zara–Titanedi
Selle Italia–Ghezzi
Team Cmax Dila

Team Flexpoint
Team System Data
Top Girls Fassa Bortolo Raxy Line
USA National Team
USC Chirio Forno d'Asolo

Route and stages

Classification leadership
There were four different jerseys awarded in the 2009 Giro Donne. These followed the same format as those in the men's Giro d'Italia. The leader of the General classification received a pink jersey. This classification was calculated by adding the combined finishing times of the riders from each stage, and the overall winner of this classification is considered the winner of the Giro.

Secondly, the points classification awarded the maglia ciclamino, or mauve jersey. Points were awarded for placements at stage finishes as well as at selected intermediate sprint points on the route, and the jersey would be received by the rider with the most overall points to their name.

In addition to this, there was a mountains classification, which awarded a green jersey. Points were allocated for the first few riders over selected mountain passes on the route, with more difficult passes paying more points, and the jersey would be received by the rider with the most overall points to their name.

Finally, there was the jersey for the Best Young Rider, which was granted to the highest-placed rider on the General classification aged 23 or under. This rider would receive a white jersey.

Classification standings

General classification

Points classification

Mountains classification

Young rider classification

Team classification

Sources

Giro d'Italia Femminile
Giro d'Italia Femminile
Giro d'talia Fem